The International Piranesi Award, is an biennial award for architectural projects that were created in several nations in Central Europe and the Balkans.

Started in 1989, the Piranesi Award is given out at the Piran Days of Architecture international conference in Piran, Slovenia. It was named after Giovanni Battista Piranesi. Participating countries include Austria, Bosnia, Croatia, the Czech Republic, Greece, Herzegovina, Hungary, Italy, Serbia, Slovakia, and Slovenia.

Main award 
The projects presented at the Piranesi exhibition, are selected and nominated at the end of October by the national selectors of the participating countries. Each selector can propose five projects. Fifty architectural realizations compete for the award.

The distinguished Piranesi Award, two Piranesi Honorable Mentions, and one Piranesi Student's Honorable Mention are selected by an international jury consisting of annual PDA conferencing lecturers and conferred by the honorary sponsor of the PDA Conference.

In 1989, Bogdan Bogdanović received the first Piranesi award for the Dudik Memorial Park in Vukovar, Croatia.

Recipients 
 1989 Bogdan Bogdanović, Yugoslavia for Dudik Memorial Park, Vukovar, 1978–1980
 1990 Vojteh Ravnikar, Slovenia for Resljeva apartment building, Ljubljana
 1991 , Italy for office building Bergamin, Portogruaro
 1992 , Austria for Student residence WIST, Graz, 1989
 1993 Much Untertrifaller, Gerhard Hörburger, Austria for Silvrettahaus, Bielerhöhe Pass
 1994 Roberto Pirzio Biroli with Sandra Martincich, and Maddalena Pandolfi, Italy for Parco Botanico Friulano "Cormor", 1990–93
 1995 Hans Peter Wörndl, Austria for "Gucklhupf", Mondsee, 1992–93
 1996 Michelle Cannatà, Italy and Fátima Fernandez, Portugal for Piazza N. Green
 1997 Dieter Henke and Marta Schreieck, Austria for the Bruno Kreisky School, Vienna
 1998 Urša Komac and Špela Kuhar, Slovenia for rest areas on the Kras cycling path
 1999 Sadar + Vuga, Slovenia for Chamber of Commerce and Industry of Slovenia, Ljubljana
 2001 , Italy for the plan for the Former Junghans Factory, Giudecca, Venice
 2003 , Slovenia for Shelter, Kobariški Stol
 2004 Miha Klinar, Špela Kuhar, Blaž Medja, Uroš Pavasovič, Robert Potokar, Slovenia for Unified memorial posts for hidden burial ground in Slovenia
 2005 , Saša Randić, Croatia for Primary school Fran Krsto Frankopan, island Krk
 2006 Enota, Dean Lah, Milan Tomac, Slovenia for Hotel Sotelia in spa Olimia, Olimje
 2007 Studio Njirić+Arhitekti, Croatia for Kindergarten Sunce-Retkovec, Zagreb
 2008 Ján Studený, Martin Vojta, Slovakia for Family house in Cernošice, CZ
 2009 Deca Architecture, Greece for Aloni house in Antiparos
 2010 , Matjaž Bolčina, Slovenia for The manor Naskov dvorec, Maribor, 2009
 2011 , Austria for Aflenzbrücke, Lorüns, 2010
 2012 , Austria for Islamic cemetery, Altach, 2011
 2013 Modus, Sandy Attia, Matteo Scagnol, Italy for Ring road, Bressanone, 2012
 2014 Péter Gereben, Balázs Marián, Hungary for Wine terrace and spa, Eger, Almagyar
 2015 Dinko Peračić, Croatia for Market and fish market, Vodice
 2016 , Maša Živec, Matjaž Bolčina, Slovenia for Renovation of Plečnik's house in Ljubljana, 2015
 2017  for Chapel Salgenreute Krumbach, Austria, 2016
 2018  for Galerie n09 – z33, Hasselt, Belgium, 2018
 2019 Bevk Perović Architects for New Gallery and Kasemattes, Neue Bastei, Wiener Neustadt, Austria, 2019

Gallery

Student award 
The Piranesi conference also includes an international student exhibition with awards. Participants includes seventeen architectural faculties in Europe – Graz, Spittal, Vienna, Banja Luka, Sarajevo, Split, Zagreb, Thessaloniki, Budapest, Pescara, Trieste, Bratislava, Ljubljana, Maribor, Belgrade, Novi Sad, and London.

Each faculty nominates two student projects for consideration.

References

External links 
 Piran Days of Architecture

Architecture awards
Awards established in 1989
European awards